Edgehill Theological College is the training institution for ministry in the Methodist Church in Ireland. It was founded in 1926 (ratified by Northern Ireland Parliament Act 1928) out of the Theology Department of Methodist College Belfast.

Edgehill is an affiliate college of the Queen's University Belfast, and offers students registered with QUB - Institute of Theology, study at postgraduate level. Edgehill sponsors candidates to study on the Distance Learning, Foundation Degree in Theology for Ministry, BA in Theology for Ministry or Professional Certificate in Ministry through St John's College, Nottingham validated by the University of Chester.

As part of its reconciliation initiatives, in association with Mater Dei Institute of Education (Dublin City University) and the Society of Missions to Africa, Edgehill facilitates the Exploring Theology Together programme, which is supported by the European Regional Development Fund.

The Methodist Historical Society in Ireland holds a large archive of documents, particularly relating to the rise of Methodism in Ireland in the 18th century. This includes rare documents of a demographic nature, memoirs, and letters, all of which are storied in a temperature controlled room.

References

External links
 http://www.edgehillcollege.org/

Bible colleges, seminaries and theological colleges in Northern Ireland
Methodist Church in Ireland